Joseph de Vrégille (31 January 1878 – 30 June 1949) was a French equestrian. He competed in two events at the 1920 Summer Olympics.

References

External links
 

1878 births
1949 deaths
French male equestrians
Olympic equestrians of France
Equestrians at the 1920 Summer Olympics
Sportspeople from Ain